Ramakrishna (born c. 1951), also known as Neernalli Ramakrishna, is an Indian actor who works predominantly in Kannada cinema, and known for his portrayal of character roles as a lead actor. He was born into the Havyaka Brahmin community in Neernalli, near Sirsi, in the erstwhile North Canara (now Uttara Kannada) region of Karnataka State. In his career spanning over 30 years, he has appeared in over 200 films, mostly Kannada and a handful in Tamil and Telugu cinema; he appeared in a lead role in K. Balachander's Poikkal Kudhirai (1983). A protégé of the renowned filmmaker Puttanna Kanagal, he featured in some of the latter's best works such as Ranganayaki (1981), Maanasa Sarovara and Amrutha Ghalige (1984). Since the 1990s, he has appeared mostly in supporting roles.

At the 2004 general elections, he contested from the erstwhile Kanara Lok Sabha constituency and lost, representing the Janata Party (JP). He had revealed that he had played the role of Lakshmana alongside Rajkumar who played the role of Lord Rama in Singeetam Srinivasa Rao's Lava Kusha which also happened to be Telugu actor Krishna's maiden Kannada venture but was stalled after a week's shooting in Hyderabad.

Partial filmography

Kannada

 Babruvahana (1977)...Krishna
 Bhagyavantharu (1977)
 Paduvaaralli Pandavaru (1978)
 Parasangada Gendethimma (1978)
 Prema Anuraga (1980)
 Nanna Rosha Nooru Varusha (1980)
 Rama Parushurama (1980)
 Ranganayaki (1981)
 Chellida Raktha (1982)
 Maanasa Sarovara (1982)
 Onde Guri (1982)
 Benkiyalli Aralida Hoovu (1984)
 Nagabekamma Nagabeku (1984)
 Shivakanye (1984)
 Devate (1986)
 Amrutha Ghalige (1984)
 Olavu Moodidaga (1984)
 Baddi Bangaramma (1984)
 Runamukthalu (1984)
 Bekkina Kannu (1984)
 Mugila Mallige (1985)
 Sneha Sambandha (1985)
 Aparoopada Kathe (1986)
 Ella Hengasarinda (1986)
 Hosa Neeru (1986)
 Nannavaru (1986)
 Tiger (1986)
 Usha (1986)
 Olavina Udugore (1987)
 Bandhamuktha (1987)
 Hrudaya Pallavi (1987)
 Mukhavada (1987)
 Sangrama (1987)
 Sri Chamundeshwari Pooja Mahime (1987)
 Yarigagi (1987)
 Dharmathma (1988)
 Gudugu Sidilu (1988)
 Kankana Bhagya (1988)
 Ladies Hostel (1988)
 Mathrudevobhava (1988)
 Mutthaide (1988)
 Sahasaveera (1988)
 Darodegala Naduve (1989)
 Muthinatha Manushya (1989)
 Yuga Purusha (1989)
 Bidisada Bandha (1989)
 Panchama Veda (1990)...Ravi
 Aata Bombata (1990)
 Halliya Surasuraru (1990)
 Shabarimale Swamy Ayyappa (1990)
 Uthkarsha (1990)
 Antharangada Mrudanga (1991)
 Iduve Jeevana (1991)
 Kadana (1991)
 Prema Pareekshe (1991)
 Sangya Balya (1992)
 Guru Brahma (1992)
 Prana Snehita (1992)
 Belli Modagalu (1992)
 Mallige Hoove (1992)
 Yarigu Helbedi (1994)
 Mister Mahesh Kumar (1994)
 Aghatha (1995)
 Hosa Baduku (1995)
 Mana Midiyithu (1995)
 Dhani(movie) (1996)
 Laali (1997)
 Amruthavarshini (1997)
 Preethsod Thappa (1998)
 Nishyabda (1998)
 Sneha (1999)
 Premotsava (1999)
 Sankata Bandaga Venkataramana (2000)
 Nan Hendthi Chennagidale (2000)
 Swalpa Adjust Madkolli (2000)
 Ninagagi (2000)
 Nanjundi (2003)
 Excuse Me (2003)
 Monalisa (2004)
 Aham Premasmi (2005)
 Rishi (2005)
 Aishwarya (2006)
 Ugadi (2007)
 Ee Sambhashane (2007)
 Preethigaagi (2007)
 Vimukti (2010)
 Edegarike (2012)...Rashmi's father
 Gombegala Love (2013)
 Jailalitha (2014)
 Bachchan (2013)
 Raja Rajendra (2015)...Neelakanta Raju

Tamil
Pannai Purathu Pandavargal (1982)
 Poikkal Kudhirai (1983) as Indu
Anney Anney (1983) as Malli
 Kadhale En Kadhale (2006) as Rajiv's father
 Nisabdham (2017) as Judge

Telugu
 1940 Lo Oka Gramam (2008)
 Black Cat (2010)

References

External links

 
 Filmography of Ramakrishna

Male actors in Kannada cinema
Male actors in Tamil cinema
Indian male film actors
Living people
1954 births
Date of birth missing (living people)
People from Uttara Kannada
Male actors in Telugu cinema
Male actors from Karnataka
20th-century Indian male actors
21st-century Indian male actors